Ester Naomi Perquin (born 16 January 1980) is a Dutch poet.

She was born in Utrecht and grew up in Zierikzee. Perquin worked in the prison service to pay for her studies at the school of creative writing in Amsterdam. She was editor for the literary journal Tirade and wrote a column for the weekly De Groene Amsterdammer. Perquin was also the city poet for Rotterdam for two years.

Her first collection of poetry Servetten Halfstok (Napkins At Half Mast) was published in 2007. This was followed by Namens de ander (On Behalf of the Other) in 2009 which received the Jo Peters Poetry Prize in 2010 and the J.C. Bloem-poëzieprijs in 2011. Her third collection published in 2012 Celinspecties (Cell Inspections) was awarded the VSB Poetry Prize.

She received the Anna Blaman Prijs in 2010.

In 2017, she was elected Dutch Dichter des Vaderlands (the Dutch counterpart of Britain's Poet Laureate of the United Kingdom).

References 

21st-century Dutch poets
Dutch poets laureate
Dutch women poets
Dutch journalists
Writers from Utrecht (city)
People from Zierikzee
1980 births
Living people